Billy Houghton (born 20 February 1939 in Hemsworth, Yorkshire) is an English former professional footballer. During his career he made over 200 appearances for Barnsley, 139 appearances for Rotherham United, over 100 appearances Ipswich Town and 51 appearances for Watford.Started out at Barnsley as a part-time professional having a job in the building trade.

External links 
Billy Houghton profile at Ipswich Town Talk
Billy Houghton at Pride of Anglia

Living people
1939 births
Association football defenders
Barnsley F.C. players
Watford F.C. players
Leicester City F.C. players
Rotherham United F.C. players
Ipswich Town F.C. players
People from Hemsworth
Sportspeople from Yorkshire
English footballers